Savage Land is a hidden prehistoric land in Marvel comic books.

Savage Land or The Savage Land may also refer to:

Savage Land (film), 1994 western film directed by Dean Hamilton
Savage Land (album), 1999 album by Mob Rules
The Wilderness (play), 1936 Chinese play by Cao Yu, also translated as The Savage Land
The Savage Land (film), 1981 film adaptation of Cao Yu's play
The Savage Land (opera), 1987 Chinese-language western opera based on Cao Yu's play